Richard Shenton (born 27 May 1972) was an English cricketer. He was a right-handed batsman and right-arm medium-fast bowler who played for Cheshire. He was born in Macclesfield.

Shenton, who made two appearances for the team during the 2001 Minor Counties Championship, made two appearances in the C&G Trophy in August and September 2001. Though he did not bat on his debut, he scored 29 runs in his second match.

External links
Richard Shenton at CricketArchive 

1972 births
Living people
English cricketers
Cheshire cricketers
Sportspeople from Macclesfield